Princess Sarah is a Japanese animated television series aired in 1985, based on the novel A Little Princess by Frances Hodgson Burnett.

Princess Sarah may also refer to:

 Sarah Culberson, Sierra Leone princess
 Princess Sarah Zeid of Jordan, Jordanian princess
 Sarah, Duchess of York, former wife of Prince Andrew, Duke of York
 Princess Sarah (TV series), a Philippine TV series based from the same title aired in 2007

See also 
Lady Sarah (disambiguation)

Sarah